Bragino is a rural locality (a selo) in Martynovsky Selsoviet, Yeltsovsky District, Altai Krai, Russia. The population was 86 as of 2013. There is 1 street.

Geography 
Bragino is located 36 km southwest of Yeltsovka (the district's administrative centre) by road. Martynovo is the nearest rural locality.

References 

Rural localities in Yeltsovsky District